William Stephen Richard King-Hall, Baron King-Hall of Headley (21 January 1893 – 2 June 1966) was a British naval officer, writer, politician and playwright who served as the member of parliament for Ormskirk from 1939 to 1945.

Early life and career
The son of Admiral Sir George Fowler King-Hall and Olga Felicia Ker; theirs was an artistic naval family, King-Hall's sisters Magdalen and Lou also being writers. He married Kathleen Amelia Spencer (died 14 August 1950), daughter of Francis Spencer, on 15 April 1919 and they had three children, Ann, Frances Susan and Jane.

He was educated at Lausanne in Switzerland and at the Royal Naval College in Dartmouth. He gained the rank of commander in the service of the Royal Navy in 1928, before resigning in 1929. He wrote several plays between 1924 and 1940, including Posterity accepted by Leonard Woolf for the Hogarth Essays. He joined the Royal Institute of International Affairs in 1929, having previously been awarded their gold medal for his 1920 thesis on submarine warfare.

Member of Parliament
He entered the House of Commons in 1939 as Member of Parliament (MP) for Ormskirk unopposed, standing as the National Labour candidate. He later changed his affiliation and continued to stand as an Independent, subsequently losing the seat to future Prime Minister Harold Wilson in the 1945 general election. During his term, he served in the Ministry of Aircraft Production under Max Aitken as Director of the Factory Defence Section.

In 1944 he founded and chaired the Hansard Society to promote parliamentary democracy. He presented a programme for children on current affairs on both BBC radio and television.

Life after Parliament and death
He was invested as a Knight Bachelor on 6 July 1954 and was created a Life Peer as Baron King-Hall of Headley on 15 January 1966. He lived at Hartfield House, Headley until his death in Westminster on 2 June 1966.

Bibliography

Political and Historical
 A Naval Lieutenant, 1914–1918 as Etienne  
 Diary of a U-Boat-Commander 1918, as "Etienne", 1918
 Western Civilisation and the Far East, 1924 
 Imperial Defence 
 The China of To-day 
 The War at Sea, 1914–1918 
 Submarines in the Future of Naval Warfare, 1920. Thesis.
 Our Own Times, 2 vols, 1935 
 London Newsletter (a.k.a. K-H Weekly News Letter Service, National News Letter), 1936. 
 Total Victory, 1941 
 Britain's Third Chance, 1943 
 My Naval Life, 1952 
 History in Hansard (with Ann Dewar), 1952 
 The Communist Conspiracy, 1953 
 Defence in the Nuclear Age. Gollancz, London, 1958; Nyack, N.Y.: Fellowship, 1959. 
 Common Sense in Defence, 1960 
 Men of Destiny, 1960 
 Our Times, 1900–1960, 1961 
 Power Politics in the Nuclear age. Gollancz, London, 1962. 

In Defence in the Nuclear Age he advocated a British policy of unilateral nuclear disarmament and national defence involving some reliance on conventional military force. This was to be supplemented by "a defence system of non-violence against violence" - what is often called "defence by civil resistance" or "social defence".

In Men of Destiny he criticised all sides for the creation of the Cold War and further promoted his aim of nuclear disarmament.

There have been several accounts and appraisals of his work advocating unilateral nuclear disarmament and defence by civil resistance.

Children
 Letters to Hilary, 1928 
 Hilary Growing Up, 1929, E. Benn, London. 

The latter described by the author as building "upon the foundations laid down in its predecessor Letters to Hilary. This book is for children from twelve to ninety... a series of essays, or talks... on sociology."

Novels
 Moment of No Return, Ballantine Books (No. F543), New York, 1961. A Cold - War novel about tensions between the Soviet Bloc and the West.

Plays
 Posterity, 1927
 The Middle Watch, 1929
 The Midshipmaid, 1931
 Admirals All, 1934
 Tropical Trouble, 1936
 The Middle Watch, 1940
 Off the Record, 1947
 Carry on Admiral, 1957
 Girls at Sea, 1958

Radio
 BBC Children's Hour

See also

 Civil resistance
 Hansard Society
 Nonviolent resistance
 Social defence

References

External links 
   
 
 
 
 
 A North Sea Diary 1914-1918  Account of his experience on board the Southampton
 
The papers of Baron King-Hall of Headley at Churchill Archives Centre

1893 births
1966 deaths
20th-century British dramatists and playwrights
British anti–nuclear weapons activists
British male journalists
Campaign for Nuclear Disarmament activists
Children's Hour presenters
Knights Bachelor
Life peers
Members of the Parliament of the United Kingdom for English constituencies
National Labour (UK) politicians
Royal Navy officers of World War I
UK MPs 1935–1945
UK MPs who were granted peerages
Life peers created by Elizabeth II
Writers from London